Marnie Baizley (born July 24, 1975 in Winnipeg, Manitoba) is a professional squash player who represented Canada during her career. She reached a career-high world ranking of World No. 30 in July 1999 after having joined the Women's International Squash Players Association in 1997.

External links 
 

1975 births
Living people
Canadian female squash players
Pan American Games gold medalists for Canada
Pan American Games silver medalists for Canada
Pan American Games bronze medalists for Canada
Pan American Games medalists in squash
Squash players at the 1999 Pan American Games
Squash players at the 2003 Pan American Games
Sportspeople from Winnipeg
Medalists at the 1999 Pan American Games
Medalists at the 2003 Pan American Games